Werner Rolfinck  (15 November 1599 – 6 May 1673) was a German physician, scientist and botanist. He was a medical student in Leiden, Oxford, Paris, and Padua.

Biography
Rolfinck earned his master's degree at the University of Wittenberg under Daniel Sennert, and his medical doctorate in 1625 at the University of Padua under the guidance of Adriaan van den Spiegel.

In 1629, he became a professor at the University of Jena, where he, along with Paul Marquard Schlegel, rearranged and expanded the university's botanical garden (the Botanischer Garten Jena). His experimental research involved chemical reactions and the biochemistry of metals acquiring him the title of "director of chemical exercises". He rejected the view that other metals could be transformed into gold.

Works 
 Guerneri Rolfincii, Phil. Ac Med. Doctoris Et Professoris Publici Chimia In Artis Formam Redacta : Sex Libris comprehensa .... Genevae, 1671 Digital edition of the University and State Library Düsseldorf.

References

External links
 

1599 births
1673 deaths
Leiden University alumni
Alumni of the University of Oxford
University of Paris alumni
University of Wittenberg alumni
University of Padua alumni
Academic staff of the University of Jena
17th-century German physicians
17th-century German botanists
17th-century German chemists
17th-century German philosophers
Physicians from Hamburg
17th-century German writers
17th-century German male writers